Nigeria church attack may refer to:

Ondo church attack, 5 June 2022, in Ondo State
5 July 2015 Nigeria attacks, suicide bombing at an evangelical church in Potiskum, Yobe State
December 2012 shootings in Northern Nigeria, 25 December 2012, at churches in Maiduguri and Potiskum
Deeper Life Bible Church shooting, 7 August 2012, in the town of Otite
Christmas 2011 Nigeria attacks, 25 December 2011, at multiple churches